In numerical analysis, multivariate interpolation is interpolation on functions of more than one variable (multivariate functions); when the variates are spatial coordinates, it is also known as spatial interpolation.

The function to be interpolated is known at given points  and the interpolation problem consists of yielding values at arbitrary points .

Multivariate interpolation is particularly important in geostatistics, where it is used to create a digital elevation model from a set of points on the Earth's surface (for example, spot heights in a topographic survey or depths in a hydrographic survey).

Regular grid

For function values known on a regular grid (having predetermined, not necessarily uniform, spacing), the following methods are available.

Any dimension
 Nearest-neighbor interpolation
 n-linear interpolation (see bi- and trilinear interpolation and multilinear polynomial)
 n-cubic interpolation (see bi- and tricubic interpolation)
 Kriging
 Inverse distance weighting
 Natural neighbor interpolation
 Spline interpolation
 Radial basis function interpolation

2 dimensions
 Barnes interpolation
 Bilinear interpolation
 Bicubic interpolation 
 Bézier surface
 Lanczos resampling 
 Delaunay triangulation

Bitmap resampling is the application of 2D multivariate interpolation in image processing.

Three of the methods applied on the same dataset, from 25 values located at the black dots. The colours represent the interpolated values.

See also Padua points, for polynomial interpolation in two variables.

3 dimensions
 Trilinear interpolation
 Tricubic interpolation

See also bitmap resampling.

Tensor product splines for N dimensions

Catmull-Rom splines can be easily generalized to any number of dimensions.
Rewrite this approximation as

This formula can be directly generalized to N dimensions:

Note that similar generalizations can be made for other types of spline interpolations, including Hermite splines.
In regards to efficiency, the general formula can in fact be computed as a composition of successive -type operations for any type of tensor product splines, as explained in the tricubic interpolation article.
However, the fact remains that if there are  terms in the 1-dimensional -like summation, then there will be  terms in the -dimensional summation.

Irregular grid (scattered data) 
Schemes defined for scattered data on an irregular grid are more general.
They should all work on a regular grid, typically reducing to another known method.
 Nearest-neighbor interpolation
 Triangulated irregular network-based natural neighbor
 Triangulated irregular network-based linear interpolation (a type of piecewise linear function)
 n-simplex (e.g. tetrahedron) interpolation (see barycentric coordinate system)
 Inverse distance weighting
 Kriging
 Gradient-enhanced kriging (GEK)
 Thin plate spline
 Polyharmonic spline (the thin-plate-spline is a special case of a polyharmonic spline)
 Radial basis function (Polyharmonic splines are a special case of radial basis functions with low degree polynomial terms)
 Least-squares spline
 Natural neighbour interpolation
Gridding is the process of converting irregularly spaced data to a regular grid (gridded data).

See also
Smoothing
Surface fitting

Notes

External links
 Example C++ code for several 1D, 2D and 3D spline interpolations (including Catmull-Rom splines).
 Multi-dimensional Hermite Interpolation and Approximation, Prof. Chandrajit Bajaja, Purdue University
 Python library containing 3D and 4D spline interpolation methods.

 
Interpolation